John Guinan (born 26 December 1961) is an Irish retired Gaelic footballer. His league and championship career with the Offaly senior team spanned ten seasons from 1980 to 1989.

Guinan made his senior debut for Offaly during the 1980-81 league. Over the course of the next ten seasons he won one All-Ireland medal. Guinan also won two Leinster medals. He played his last game for Offaly in November 1989.

Honours

Offaly
All-Ireland Senior Football Championship (1): 1982
Leinster Senior Football Championship (2): 1981, 1982

References

1961 births
Living people
Irish engineers
Offaly inter-county Gaelic footballers
Raheen Gaelic footballers
Winners of one All-Ireland medal (Gaelic football)